H. Craig Hanna (born 1967), is an American figurative painter living in Paris.

The National Museum of History and Art  (MNHA) Luxembourg, which hosted an exhibition of his work in 2016, describes his work with the following: “He reinterprets the history of European painting through the eyes of a master draughtsman and the unique viewpoint of an artist of his time by developing his very own technique (painting on Plexiglas) featuring striking colour effects and compositions.”

In addition to Paris, he has lived and worked in New York, London and Malta.

Early life and education 

H. Craig Hanna was born in Cleveland, Ohio in 1967. He has been drawing since his childhood. He earned his BFA from Syracuse University  in 1994 and his MFA from the  School of Visual Arts  in 1996. He started doing figurative classical painting from life at that time. His teacher John Foot introduced him to the Great Masters of figurative painting, such as Rembrandt, Velasquez, Sargent and Ingres. The Metropolitan Museum of Art played an important role in the painter’s artistic education.

In 1998, Bergdorf Goodman held his first solo show in New York. Since, he has had shows in London, 
in Hong Kong and in Malta.

Shortlisted in 2001 and 2006 for the National Portrait Gallery Portrait Award, he was rewarded in 2001 for his work 'Carlos sitting on a clear plastic chair'.

After his first Parisian exhibition in June 2008, he chose to settle in Paris. In September 2008, Laurence Esnol Gallery opened to solely represent the works of H. Craig Hanna.

Art 

The work of H. Craig Hanna continues in the tradition of Ancient Masters. His choices in terms of framing, color, composition and model root him in his time and century. His influences range from classical western painting (Titian, Rembrandt, Velasquez) to masters of the 19th century (Sargent, Whistler) and of the 20th century (Klimt, Schiele, Lucian Freud). Ancient Greek sculpture is also a major source of inspiration.

His portraits convey a strong human dimension, with particular emphasis on the subject's vulnerability, mitigated by a sense of benevolence. H. Craig Hanna often chooses his models according to their distinctive intensity. Each portrait is hence an expression of the model's singularity.

Hanna's technical mastery expresses itself in many ways, from oil paint on wood or canvas to works on paper (oil pastel, pencil, charcoal…). The use of reverse plexiglas paint was a breakthrough in his work. Experimenting with the possibilities of this technique, playing with the effects of depth and transparency for instance, enabled him to explore new artistic paths.

Journalist and art critic Christopher Mooney describes his work as following: ‘While antecedents are visible in HANNA’s pictures, in both their contents and surfaces (...) HANNA pushes past these to create vital works that are brashly contemporary and unmistakably his own.’ H. Craig Hanna does so ‘by eschewing, even sabotaging, the strategies of most contemporary figurative painting: he chooses his subjects from “life” instead of photographs; he roots his formal concerns—line, color, brushstroke, scale—in painterly traditions; and, borrowing a forgotten form of outsider “folk” art—fixé sous verre in French, Hinterglasmalerei in German, “reverse-painting” in English —he inverts the usual process of painting by doing it backwards, on Plexiglas.’

Recognition and honors 

In 2001, H. Craig Hanna was commended in the London National Portrait Gallery contest for his painting Carlos Sitting in a Clear Plastic Chair.

His work was exhibited at the Orangerie du Sénat in Paris in 2010 and the National Fine Art Museum in Malta in 2006.

H. Craig Hanna’s Arrangement of Dancers was acquired by the MNHA in 2015. The Museum held a retrospective of his work in March 2016.

Gallery

Exhibitions 

March–June 2016: H. Craig HANNA, Peintures et Dessins, MNHA, Luxembourg
February–April 2014: Landscapes, Laurence Esnol Gallery, Paris
January 2012: BRAFA 2012, Brussels, Laurence Esnol Gallery
November 2011: St’Art, Strasburg, Laurence Esnol Gallery
October 2011: SHOW Off, Paris, Laurence Esnol Gallery
May 2011: Art by Genève, Geneva, Laurence Esnol Gallery
January 2011: BRAFA 2011, Brussels, Laurence Esnol Gallery
November 2010: St’Art, Strasburg, Laurence Esnol Gallery
October 2010: SHOW Off, Paris, Laurence Esnol Gallery
August 2010: Orangerie du Sénat, Sénat, Paris, Laurence Esnol Gallery
April 2010: Lille Art Fair, Lille, Laurence Esnol Gallery
March 2010: Chic Dessin, Paris, Laurence Esnol Gallery
March 2010: Pavillon des Arts et du Design, Paris, Laurence Esnol Gallery
December 2009: St’Art, Strasburg, Laurence Esnol Gallery
November 2009 : Art en Capitale, Paris, Laurence Esnol Gallery
September 2009 : Salon des Collectionneurs, Paris, Laurence Esnol Gallery
June 2009 : Scope Art Basel, Basel, Laurence Esnol Gallery
March 2009 : Art Paris 09, Paris, Laurence Esnol Gallery
April 2008 : SLICK Dessin, Paris, Cynthia Corbett Gallery 
March 2008: SOBO GALLERY, Solo Show, Cynthia Corbett Gallery , London Bermondsey Street
March 2008 : Red Dot, Cynthia Corbett Gallery , New York
February 2008 : Nouveauté Gallery, Habitat Solo Show Kings Road, London
August 2007: Cuccumio Gallery, Solo Show Sardinia
March 2007: Blenhiem Gallery, Three Yellows Solo Show Notting Hill, London
June 2006: National Portrait Gallery BP Portrait Award, London
April 2006: National Museum of Fine Arts, Solo Show, Malta
September 2002 : Westbourne Studios, Gimme Five Group Show, London
June 2001 : National Portrait Gallery BP, Portrait Award, London
June 2001 : The Brick House Gallery, Solo Show Brick Lan, London
September 2000 : The Oxo Gallery, Group Show, London
February 2000 : Galerie Martini, Solo Show Wellington Street, Hong Kong
December 1999 : Blains Fine Art, Group Show Bruton Street, London
November 1999 : Groucho Club, Solo Show Dean Street, London
July 1998 : Lehman Sann Gallery, Group Show, Broadway, New York
June 1998 : Gallery At Bergdorf Goodman, Solo Show Fifth Avenue, New York
May 1997 : Belgrade Gallery, Solo Show, Wooster Street, New York
February 1997 : Space Gallery, Solo Show, Broadway, New York
March 1996 : School of Visual Art Degree Show, New York

Bibliography 
H. Craig Hanna, Peintures et Dessins, co-published by Editions Michèle and Laurence Esnol Gallery
 Sketchbook by H. Craig Hanna, co-published by Somogy Éditions d'Art and Laurence Esnol Gallery.

References

External links 
 
 

American male painters
American portrait painters
Painters from Ohio
1967 births
Living people